José Antonio Castro González (born 11 August 1980) is a Mexican former professional footballer who played as a right-back. He gained notoriety for his performances with Club América and at the 2006 FIFA World Cup for Mexico. He is often referred to by his nickname "El Gringo", given to him in his childhood because his parents are both Spanish, and his blue eyes.

Club career
Known for his speed and solid defensive work rate, Castro was a good marker and counter-attacker who was trained in the Club América youth system. He made his debut in the Mexican Championship against Leon in the 2000–2001 season. After receiving little playing time in his first two seasons with the senior team, Castro became a vital player for the club in the Verano 2002 season, displaying fine form which helped Club América win the Mexican league championships in 2002 and the Clausura title in 2005. The talented wingback was a key player and is one of the two  players (the other being Guillermo Ochoa) to have started every game of the 2004–2005 season. 
For the Clausura 2008, El Gringo had the responsibility of being the vice-captain of Las Águilas since Duilio Davino left the club and Germán Villa was given the job of being the team's captain. After a poor season with Club América, El Gringo was put on the transfer list. On December 5, 2008, Castro was loaned to Tigres UANL for an undisclosed fee.

International career
Castro made his international debut for the Mexico national team in Los Angeles in a friendly match against Argentina on February 4, 2003. Ricardo La Volpe played him as a right winger as usual, but as a midfielder instead of defender. He played his first World Cup match against Portugal in Germany, a game which the Mexicans lost 2–1. Despite the team losing the match, Castro helped his country reach the Round of 16 where they played against Argentina. Since then, he has been called up to play friendly matches. He was even called up to play the 2007 editions of the Gold Cup and Copa América for Mexico. Recently, he was called up by Mexico coach Javier Aguirre for the 2009 Gold Cup. He scored his only international goal against the United States in the 2009 CONCACAF Gold Cup Final.

Honours
América
Mexican Primera División: Verano 2002, Clausura 2005
Campeón de Campeones: 2005
CONCACAF Champions' Cup: 2006
CONCACAF Giants Cup: 2001

Tigres UANL
North American SuperLiga: 2009

Mexico
CONCACAF Gold Cup: 2009

Individual
Mexican Primera División Best Defensive Wing Back: Apertura 2005

Career statistics

International

International goals
Scores and results list Mexico's goal tally first.

References

External links
 
 
 
 
  
  
 

1980 births
Living people
Footballers from Mexico City
Mexican people of Spanish descent
Association football defenders
Mexico international footballers
CONCACAF Gold Cup-winning players
2006 FIFA World Cup players
2007 Copa América players
2007 CONCACAF Gold Cup players
2009 CONCACAF Gold Cup players
Halcones de Querétaro footballers
Club América footballers
Tigres UANL footballers
Club Necaxa footballers
Tecos F.C. footballers
San Luis F.C. players
Atlante F.C. footballers
Atlético San Luis footballers
Liga MX players
Querétaro F.C. non-playing staff
Cruz Azul non-playing staff
Mexican footballers